The zebra bullhead shark (Heterodontus zebra) is a bullhead shark of the family Heterodontidae found in the central Indo-Pacific between latitudes 40°N and 20°S, from Japan and Korea to Australia. The reproduction of this bullhead shark is oviparous.

References

Heterodontidae
Fish described in 1831
Taxa named by John Edward Gray